Youngstown is an unincorporated community in Adair County, in the U.S. state of Missouri.

History
A post office called Youngstown was established in 1903, and remained in operation until 1942. The community derives its name from George Young, the original owner of the town site.

References

Unincorporated communities in Adair County, Missouri
Unincorporated communities in Missouri